Papyrus 8 (in the Gregory-Aland numbering), signed by  or α 8 (von Soden), is an early copy of the New Testament in Greek. It is a papyrus manuscript of the Acts of the Apostles, it contains Acts 4:31–37; 5:2–9; 6:1–6.8–15. The manuscript paleographically has been assigned to the 4th century.

The text is written in two columns per page, 25 lines per page.

Text
The Greek text of this codex is a representative of the Alexandrian text-type. Aland placed it in Category II.

The text of the codex was published by Salonius in 1927.

Location
It is currently housed at the Staatliche Museen zu Berlin (Inv. no. 8683) in Berlin.

See also 
 Acts of the Apostles: chapter 4, 5, and 6
 List of New Testament papyri

References

Further reading 

 C. R. Gregory, Textkritik des Neuen Testaments III (Leipzig: 1909), pp. 1087–1090.
 
 A. H. Salonius, Die griechischen Handschriftenfragmente des Neuen Testaments in den Staatlichen Museen zu Berlin, ZNW 26 (1927), pp. 97–119.

External links 
 Digital image of P8 at CSNTM

New Testament papyri
4th-century biblical manuscripts
Papyri of the Berlin State Museums
Acts of the Apostles papyri